What Was Done, Vol. 1: A Decade Revisited is an acoustic album by rock band the Classic Crime released on October 28, 2014 via BadChristian Music. Like their previous effort, Phoenix (2012), the album was funded through the website Kickstarter. Kickstarter backers were able to digitally download the album one week prior to its release date.

A Kickstarter project entitled "Help The Classic Crime Make 'What Was Done: Volume One'" was created on October 15, 2013, with a funding goal of $15,000. The goal was met within the first two days of the project being posted. Crowdfunding process successfully finished on November 13, 2013, with $50,457 pledged.

Track listing

Personnel 

 Matt MacDonald – vocals, guitars
 Robbie Negrin – guitar, group vocals
 Alan Clark – bass, group vocals
 Paul "Skip" Erickson – drums, group vocals

References

2014 albums
The Classic Crime albums